Venkatesh is an Indian film actor known for his works predominantly in Telugu cinema. In a career spanning twenty nine years, he starred in seventy two feature films. He has played a variety of challenging roles in Telugu cinema and a few Bollywood films. He has received seven state Nandi awards, and six Filmfare Awards for best acting.

Along with his brother D. Suresh Babu, Venkatesh is the co-owner of Suresh Productions, one of the largest film production companies in India. Venkatesh has starred in several of his films under this production, most of them turned out to be blockbusters, owing to this, he is widely known as Victory Venkatesh in the media. Apart from films, He is the Captain of Telugu Warriors representing Tollywood in Celebrity Cricket League.

Film

All films are in Telugu unless otherwise noted.

As a child artist

As actor

Television

Voice acting

Other crew positions

References

Indian filmographies
Male actor filmographies